Five Corners is an unincorporated community in Outagamie County, Wisconsin, United States. It is located in the towns of Black Creek, Center, Freedom, and Osborn.

Geography
Five Corners is located at  (44.414722, -88.373889). Its elevation is 814 feet (248.1m).

Transportation

References

External links
 Hometown Locator-Five Corners

Unincorporated communities in Outagamie County, Wisconsin
Unincorporated communities in Wisconsin